Julia Williams may refer to:

Julia Williams (abolitionist) (1811–1870), American abolitionist
Julia Williams (academic), paramedic science academic
Julia Williams, poet 2004 in poetry
Julia Williams, nurse and candidate in the United States House of Representatives elections in Michigan, 2010